German Fernandez (born November 2, 1990) is a retired American professional runner from Riverbank, California, known for his performance in high school and collegiate cross country and track and field. Later he trained under Jerry Schumacher for the Bowerman Track Club. He is most well known for running the California Cross Country State Meet course record (14:24), as well as running a new American high-school record, 8:34.40 for two miles, at the 2008 Nike Outdoor Nationals championship. He also holds the World Junior Indoor Mile record at 3:55.02.
A local meet in Riverbank, California, the German Fernandez Distance Carnival, is named after him.

Running career

High school
Fernandez was coached by Bruce Edwards of Riverbank High School, which competes in Division IV of the Sac-Joaquin Section. Fernandez first drew some attention as a high school freshman in track, when he raced 1600m in 4:22.95. During his 2005 CIF State championship victory, he clocked the second fastest sophomore time of all divisions, 15:14, on the heralded Woodward Park course. He went through a number of injuries throughout his junior year, giving him a relatively slow season. Fernandez set a number of course records in California. He won the prestigious Stanford Invitational (5k) with a time of 14:42, gapping the second place runner by 40 seconds. He won the Sac-Joaquin Section finals race with a time of 15:03, setting the course record and leading his team to win the section title. This culminated with his performance at the 2007 California CIF state meet where he ran the 5k race in 14:24, breaking the historic course record set by Olympian Marc Davis by 14 seconds. The performance is seen as one of the most outstanding in the history of high school distance running.

In 2007, Fernandez took first place at the Foot Locker West Regional, finishing in a  time of 14:53. Running with an injured foot, Fernandez finished his high school cross country career placing third at the 2007 Foot Locker Cross Country Championships, 19 seconds behind winner Mike Fout of La Porte, Indiana.

On February 16, 2008, Fernandez won the USATF Cross Country Junior Nationals  at Mission Bay Park in San Diego in 24:18. This earned him a berth to the USA squad for the IAAF Junior World Cross Country Championships.

In the 2008 CIF California State Meet at Cerritos College in Norwalk, California, Fernandez ran a 4:00.29 for 1600 meters to break Ryan Hall's state meet record of 4:02.62, and 3 hours later, ran the 3200m in 8:34.23. Fernandez's 8:34.23 (~=8:37.43 for 2 miles) converts slightly slower to the American high school  record of 8:36.3. However, his 4:00.29/8:34.23 double for 1600/3200 meters is the fastest distance double in American high school history, beating Rich Kimball's 4:06.6/8:46.5 mile/two-mile double set at the 1974 California state high school championship meet.

Three weeks later, on June 20, 2008, Fernandez surpassed Jeff Nelson's 29-year-old national high school record for the  race at Nike Outdoor Nationals, winning with a time of 8:34.40. Fernandez opened his first mile in 4:19.4, and finished with a second mile of 4:15. He also broke Galen Rupp's high school 3000 meter record with a 3000-meter split of 7:59.82.

He was Track and Field News "High School Athlete of the Year" in 2008.

Collegiate
The top distance recruit in the nation, Fernandez elected to attend Oklahoma State University in Stillwater, Oklahoma, to run for Coach Dave Smith. During the Razorback Invitational, Fernandez broke a World Junior Record by running 3:56.5 mile indoors. At the Big 12 Championships, he ran 3:55.02 to further his record and beat the converted collegiate indoor record in the mile.

In outdoor track, he broke Galen Rupp's American Junior Record at 5000 meters at the Payton Jordan Cardinal Invitational, but Chris Derrick finished ahead of German to take the American Junior Record. However, at the 2009 USA Outdoor Track and Field National Championships he placed 5th in the 5000m, beating Derrick's American Junior Record in a time of 13:25.46.

He was the 2009 NCAA Division I champion in the outdoor 1500 meters, winning in 3:39.00.

Bowerman Track Club
Fernandez is now coached by Jerry Schumacher in Portland, Oregon, where he trains with his 2009 IAAF World Cross Country Championships teammate Chris Derrick. Fernandez finished 11th at 2009 IAAF World Cross Country Championships – Junior men's race. He finished 25th at the 36th 2008 2008 IAAF World Cross Country Championships – Junior men's race with a time of 24:15, leading Team United States to a sixth-place team finish in Edinburgh, Scotland. Fernandez ran 13:47 5000 meters on 15 June 2014 at the Portland Track Festival.

Fernandez finished 2nd at 2014 USA Road 5k Championships and 8th the following year.

Post-professional Career

In February 2017, Fernandez joined his alma mater as a graduate assistance coach.

Personal bests

* This is the Junior (under age 20) Indoor World Record

** Stood as the American High School record until 2011

*** This is the Junior (under age 20) American national record

References

External links
Flotrack Race Videos/Interviews with German Fernandez

Living people
1990 births
American male middle-distance runners
American male long-distance runners
People from Stanislaus County, California
Track and field athletes from California
American male mountain runners